Sinyaya Ptitsa (The Blue Bird) was a Soviet music group, vocal and instrumental ensemble, which existed from 1972 to 1991. Later, several Russian musical groups created by former members of the original band took the name Sinyaya Ptitsa.

History
The band formed in 1972 in the city of Gomel (Belarus) as vocal-instrumental ensemble We, You and Guitar. In its structure were Sergey Drozdov (at the time- a student of the Gomel Music College, Sokolovsky),  Vyacheslav Yatsyna, Valery Pavlov, Boris Belotserkovskii, Yuri Metyolkin, Yakov Tsyporkin and Vladimir Blum. Subsequently, the band was called Voices of Polesie and became the winner of the Belarusian National Competition and all-union competition.

In 1978 the ensemble was awarded the All-Union Competition entertainers. In 1986 the group took part in the festival Rock for Peace  in the Czech town of Sokolovo, and then sent to entertain Soviet troops in Germany.

According to Rossiyskaya Gazeta, Drozdov was one of the recognizable voices in the Soviet Union.

In 1987, Blue Bird participated in the Festival of Soviet-Indian friendship. In February 1988, the band held concerts for Soviet troops in Poland and the Afghan cities of Kabul, Herat, and Bagram. In the summer of 1991, the group arranged tours to the United States, and returned to the newly formed Russian Federation.

Composition VIA Blue Bird (1972-1991) 
 Valentin Barkov (bass guitar, vocals)
 Yuri Bankovsky (violin)
 Boris Belotserkovsky (drums)
 Robert Bolotny (saxophone)
 Mikhail Bolotny (mus. head, keyboards)
 Victor Varvalyuk (drums)
 Yevgeny  Voynov (vocals)
 Oleg Gazmanov (sound engineer)
 Dmitry Galitsky (keyboards) (died 21 October 2021)
 Vladimir  Gaponov (guitar)
 Eduard Deyneko (trumpet)
 Igor Dotsenko (drums)
 Sergey Drozdov (bass guitar, vocals)
 Yevgeny Zavyalov (vocals)
 Alexander Zverovich (vocals)
 Sergei Kastorsky (keyboards)
 Oleg Kolesnichenko (vocals)
 Alexey Komarov (drums)
 Yakov Kulishevsky (vocals)
 Svetlana Lazareva (vocals)
 Sergei Levkin (guitar, vocals)
 Vitaly Loos (trombone)
 Gennady Matviyenko (guitar)
 Valery Melnikov (trumpet)
Yuri Metelkin (vocals)
 Alexander Mostovoy (guitar)
 Anatoly Murygin (guitar)
 Lev Panin (violin)
 Nikolai Parfenyuk (vocals)
 Vladimir Preobrazhensky (vocals)
 Valery Pronin (violin)
 Alexander Pruzhinin (keyboards)
 Victor Ryabkov (vocals)
 Anna Salmina (vocals)
 Igor Sarukhanov (guitar, vocals)
 Vladimir Ulyanov (violin)
 Yuri Humaryan (guitar)
 Igor Shablovsky (guitar)
  Vladimir Shurigin (guitar)
 Valery Yushchenko  (vocals)
 Jury Janin  (guitar)

References

External links

 Информация о ВИА на сайте «Популярная советская песня» 
Sinyaya Ptitsa Homepage
 ВИА «Синяя птица». Музыка для тех, кто любит… 
 Синяя птица. Русский  Юрай хип 
  История ВИА «Синяя Птица» на сайте группы Комарова 
  История группы «Синяя птица» на сайте группы Дроздова 
 ВИА "Синяя птица". Музыканты ансамбля (версия от 12 апреля 2005) 
 

1972 establishments in the Soviet Union
1991 disestablishments in the Soviet Union
Soviet musical groups
Russian musical groups
Musical groups established in 1972
Musical groups disestablished in 1991